The fifth and final season of 90210 was announced on May 3, 2012. On May 17, 2012, it was announced that the show's fifth season would be moving back to Mondays at 8:00pm Eastern/7:00pm Central followed by the sixth season of Gossip Girl at 9:00pm. The season premiered on October 8, 2012. Season 5 picks up where season 4 left off, the group discovers that after a year in the real world, life is very different from how it was at West Bev and discovers that there are some things that money can't buy, even in 90210. With just their friendships to count on, they search for answers to the various cliffhangers in this final season. In the series finale, they must make some life changing decisions as a major tragedy forces them to reconsider outcomes in old feuds, face certain demons that they've been ignoring for years, and make decisions that better them for the future. 

90210 went on its mid-season break on December 10, 2012 and returned on January 21, 2013 at a new time slot of 9:00 pm, one week after The Carrie Diaries premiere, which took its original time slot of 8:00 pm.

On January 13, 2013, the President of The CW Mark Pedowitz stated that although 90210 does not have a season 6 renewal in place, the show would most likely be back next year (possibly for the final season if it were to be canceled) due to him being a "big believer in giving fans a very satisfactory conclusion" for long-running shows. In spite of this, in late February it was announced that the fifth season would indeed be the final season of the show, with the series finale airing May 13, 2013.

Cast and characters

Regular
 Shenae Grimes as Annie Wilson (22 episodes)
 Tristan Wilds as Dixon Wilson (22 episodes)
 AnnaLynne McCord as Naomi Clark (22 episodes)
 Jessica Stroup as Erin Silver (22 episodes)
 Michael Steger as Navid Shirazi (19 episodes)
 Jessica Lowndes as Adrianna Tate-Duncan (22 episodes)
 Matt Lanter as Liam Court (22 episodes)

Recurring
 Josh Zuckerman as Max Miller (11 episodes)
 Trevor Donovan as Teddy Montgomery (9 episodes)
 Lyndon Smith as Michaela (9 episodes)
 Grant Gustin as Campbell Price (8 episodes)
 Riley Smith as Riley Wallace (7 episodes)
 Charlie Weber as Mark Holland (7 episodes)
 Trai Byers as Alec Martin (6 episodes)
 Jessica Parker Kennedy as Megan Rose (6 episodes)
 Robbie Jones as Jordan Welland (6 episodes)
 Wes Brown as Taylor Williams (5 episodes)
 Arielle Kebbel as Vanessa Shaw (5 episodes)
 Natalie Morales as Ashley Howard (5 episodes)
 Peyton List as Lindsey Beckwith (4 episodes)
 Keke Palmer as Elizabeth Royce Harwood (4 episodes)
 Rob Mayes as Colin Bell (3 episodes)
 Robin Givens as Cheryl Harwood (3 episodes)
 Jimmy O. Yang as Henry Lu (2 episodes)
 Chris McKenna as Patrick Westhill (2 episodes)
 Carmen Electra as Vesta (2 episodes)
 Jake Picking as Michael (1 episode)

Special guest stars
 Lori Loughlin as Debbie Wilson (1 episode)
 Prince Michael Jackson as Cooper (1 episode)
 Christina Moore as Tracy Clark (1 episode)
 Denise Richards as Gwen Thompson (1 episode)
 Lindsey McKeon as Suzanne (1 episode)
 Zachary Ray Sherman as Jasper Herman (1 episode)
 Abbie Cobb as Emily Bradford (1 episode)
 Adam Gregory (actor) as Ty Collins (1 episode)
 Carly Rae Jepsen as herself (1 episode)
 Sammy Adams as himself (1 episode)
 Ryan Lochte as himself (1 episode)
 Nelly Furtado as herself (1 episode)
 Ne-Yo as himself (1 episode)
 Jared Eng as himself (1 episode)
 Taio Cruz as himself (1 episode)
 Tegan and Sara as themselves (1 episode)
 Rita Ora as herself (1 episode)
 Terrell Owens as himself (1 episode)
 Joey McIntyre as himself (1 episode)
 Olly Murs as himself (1 episode)
 Fall Out Boy as themselves (1 episode)

Episodes

Production
 
On June 30, 2012, The CW released the first promotional ad for the fifth season. However, no new scenes featured in the 30 second ad, but rather recapped the final episode of season four. On August 23 at the 90210 launch party for season five, a new 30 second ad was released, showing brand new scenes of the upcoming season, including Justin Deeley's scenes. The CW then released another brand new promo for the fifth season on 11 of September, featuring more new scenes form the upcoming premiere, and brand new graphics for the shows promotional campaigns. On September 27, 2012, the cast and crew celebrated their 100th episode in Manhattan Beach, California.

Cast and characters
On May 22, 2012, Gillian Zinser's exit from the series was announced on TV Line. However, it was reported that Zinser will make guest appearances, although it's unclear for how many episodes. In spite of that news she never guest starred in the final season.
On June 22, 2012, Riley Smith's casting as a romantic interest for Annie was announced. Arielle Kebbel is due back for at least a few episodes and Josh Zuckerman, who plays Max, is returning in a recurring role. Trevor Donovan will return in a recurring role as Teddy Montgomery for at least the three episodes of the season, including the 100th episode. It was also reported that he was going to be upped to a main cast member for the first time since season 3. In spite of this, he only came back as a guest star for only 2 episodes out of the whole final season.
On July 6, 2012, Justin Deeley's exit from the show was announced after he was written out of the season premiere, although a rep says the "door is still open for him to reappear in future episodes." Adam Gregory reprises his role of Ty Collins in the special "what if" episode set to air in late January marking his comeback to the show after four seasons.
On July 9, 2012, it was announced that Carly Rae Jepsen would guest star as herself in the season premiere.
On July 11, 2012, Wes Brown and Trai Byers were announced to play the roles of Taylor, a club promoter, and Alec, Max's business partner, both in recurring roles. On July 18, 2012 Lori Loughlin was announced to return as Debbie Wilson for the season premiere. On August 1, 2012, it was announced that Lindsey McKeon would play Suzanne in a recurring role, as well as rapper Sam Adams to guest star as himself in an October episode. Jessica Parker Kennedy was cast in the recurring role of Megan, "a girl next door who tells her story in group therapy." On August 3, 2012, it was announced Jason Thompson would guest star as Eugene Thompsen. On August 14, 2012, it was announced that Olympics swimmer Ryan Lochte would guest star as himself. On August 22, 2012, it was revealed that Carmen Electra would appear as a recurring guest star, in an episode set to air in November, and will return again in the 100th episode later on in the season.
On August 23, 2012, E! Online reported that Nelly Furtado would be make a guest appearance as herself. It was also reported that she would be performing a new song from her upcoming album. On August 24, 2012, it was announced that Denise Richards would have a cameo in the 100th episode as wealthy socialite Gwen. On 8 September 2012, Zap2it announced that Amber Stevens would guest star as Bryce, an attractive and highly intelligent applicant to work at Max's company. Stevens will make her debut in November. On September 12, 2012, it was revealed that R&B singer Ne-Yo would guest star as himself in an episode scheduled to air in November.
On September 17, 2012, it was revealed that former Parks and Recreation's star, Natalie Morales, would play Ashley - a woman who heads up a professional security detail - in a recurring role. She will make her on-screen debut in episode 7.
On September 21, 2012, founder and editor-in-chief of JustJared.com, Jared Eng, was announced to have a cameo appearance as himself in an episode due to air in November. On September 25, 2012, TV Guide revealed that British singer Taio Cruz would guest star as himself in the 100th episode due to air in November.
On October 4, 2012, TVLine announced that Canadian cult-fave group, Tegan and Sara, would guest stars as themselves in an festive episode due to air in December. On October 6, 2012, Perez Hilton revealed that British pop star Rita Ora would be appearing as herself in an episode due in air in January 2013. On October 15, it was announced that Zachary Ray Sherman and Abbie Cobb will come back for the 100th episode and reprise their role of Jasper and Emily, respectively. This also marks Jasper's comeback after disappearing since the season 2 finale. On October 29, 2012, it was revealed that Glee star Grant Gustin would play Campbell, a charming and good-looking college student from a wealthy and privileged background and would appear in multiple episodes. On November 12, 2012, it was announced that Joey McIntyre from New Kids on the Block, would guest star in an episode due to air in February 2013, playing an up-and-coming music manager who had some business with Dixon. On November 13, 2012, it was announced that Lyndon Smith would play Michaela, a "free-spirited" and incredibly talented singer who has a connection to one of the regular characters, in a recurring role for six to nine episodes.

On January 16, 2013, it was revealed that Olly Murs would guest star as himself and perform his tracks "Troublemaker" and "Right Place Right Time" in an episode slated to air in April.
On February 19, 2013 it was reported that former One Tree Hill and Hellcats star Robbie Jones would appear in the show as a guest star playing Jordan.

Ratings

90210 opened with 0.94 viewers in its season premiere and scored a 0.4 in the demo. Episode two, however, was up 50 percent to 0.6, while rising 14 percent in total audience by hitting 1.1 million viewers.
90210 was down 10 and 33 percent, only managing 950,000 viewers and 0.4 rating in the 18-49 demographic. However, DVR ratings for episode 3 were up by 75% of three-tenths of a point from the original 0.4 to a 0.7. Though 90210 began to slip in further in viewers (850,000) during episode 4, it managed to remain stable with a 0.4. demo. Episode 5 saw a sharp rise and season high with viewers by reaching 1.16 million, as well as a sharp rise in the demo to a 0.6 up 50% from last week's 0.4 Episode 6 hit a .4 in the demo while hitting a series low in viewership with 780,000 viewers. By episode 7, 90210 seemed to have gained some audience back by reaching a .5 in the demo with 1.03 million viewers. Episode 8 stabilized at .5 in the demo but added ten thousand viewers reaching 1.04 million. The mid-season finale saw another rise in the demo garnering a .6 as well as 1.16 million live viewers tuning in. Episode 10 was down two tenths from the mid-season finale with a 0.4 in the demo while managing 790,000 live viewers. This episode also rose two tenths in DVR numbers garnering a 0.6 in the demo. Episode 11 maintained the 0.4 score in the 18-49 demographic but lost a mere ten thousand viewers averaging 780,000 live viewers. Episode 12 held onto the 0.4 demo rating and added 10,000 viewers averaging 790,000 for the night. Episode 13 hit lows in the key demo, sinking to a 0.3 and a low in viewership with 660,000 viewers. The following episode hit another low with a 0.2 in the demo grabbing 550,000 viewers. Episode 15 rose in the ratings reaching 0.3 in the demo and added 8,000 viewers for 558,000. The 18-49 rating remained the same for episode 16 with a 0.3 but rose in viewership to 664,000. The series finale, aired on May 13, 2013, scored 510,000 viewers and 0.2 in the demo 18–49, making it the least-watched finale of a CW show ever (Cult later broke the record a few months later). The retrospective, aired the same day before the finale, scored 570,000 viewers and 0.2 in the demo.

Reception

Critical reception
Zap2it thought that Teddy and Silver having a baby together is a "weird thing to happen, but we're not complaining about anything that means we'll have Trevor Donovan on our TV screens for an undetermined amount of episodes." TV Equals's, Kristen Elizabeth thought that Dixon had become unnecessary; "I just feel like he's superfluous at this point." She also predicted Naomi will sleep with Max's business partner, Alec; "Sorry, it's nothing personal. Girl just has a bad track record."
The Series finale, "We All Fall Down", marks the end of the show with mixed feelings from both critics and fans, and the cast. This was because of the notice the show was ending late in the shooting of the episode (planned as a Season finale), and the showrunners had little time to re-elaborate the storylines. Particularly, the un-satisfying ending for the character of Silver led to a serious backlash from fans and critics for the little resolution of the character after losing the baby and getting the news of cancer right in the middle of the episode. This was because Jessica Stroup already shot the entire Silver's act, with the writers unable to re-write her story. Later, Lara Olsen, showrunner for the final two years of the show, explained that "in a perfect world, we wanted Silver to find out Michaela lost her baby [...], then that she was pregnant with Mark's baby, and not with cancer." The same fate goes for AnnaLynne McCord's character, Naomi Clark. The actress, disappointed with how the series was ending for the character she portrayed for five seasons, decided to shoot her own ending as a thank you to the fans posting the video on YouTube a few minutes after the finale was aired. Matt Lanter (Liam), also speculated on the hypothetical and final sixth season that was promised but never got, saying that "we had a whole different [season finale] planned. We aged our characters five years in the potential sixth season. Liam had just gotten out of jail, and Naomi was on a private jet flying back to pick him up. She got him out of jail and said, "Officer, I'm here to pick up my husband, Liam Court," and I walked up to her and said something like, "Hello, Mrs. Court" and it actually ended right there."

Critics also reviewed negatively the writing of the past two seasons, particularly, The A.V. Club noted how the tone of the series shifted in the final two seasons (with the transition from showrunner Rebecca Sinclair at the end of season 3 to Patti Carr and Lara Olsen), saying "The first few seasons had fitfully entertaining moments—Annie's hit-and-run homicide, Teddy's coming out story, and Adrianna's descent into absolute narcissism and madness were standouts—and the third season chronicling the characters' senior year was actually a highly enjoyable lark, as the show finally figured out it could have a little bit of fun amid the constant misery. But then the cast graduated, and that's when everything just went to hell." It went on criticizing the lack of resolution for Silver, adding: "[Her] quest to have a child before she is stricken by the breast cancer that's inevitably coming to kill her (I know), was the one thing that wasn't wrapped up at all. Silver's surrogate lost her baby last week, which is tragic, and in the finale, she learns that on top of that, her potential cancer has turned into a full-blown malignancy. Will Silver die? Who knows, because there just isn't time to find out.
The majority of the finale dealt with giving anyone who wasn't Silver a happy ending, which is nice fan service but not all that interesting." They also questioned if the fan-service reuniting the core couples from previous seasons was a smart move, "I suppose, if you are one of those people who are still shipping yourself with whomever you had a crush on in high school. More egregiously, the finale acts like Annie and Liam is the ultimate endgame for the show, the couple fans are most interested in, to which I say "Really?" Are people so invested in this couple who haven't spent significant time dating since season three? Are they so invested that the big ending of Liam chasing down a plane with his motorcycle in order to propose to Annie is how they wanted this to finish up?"
On TVFanatic and Zap2it were more positive about it, noting the writers didn't have time to wrap things up.

DVD release
The DVD release of season five was released after the season has completed broadcast on television. It has been released in Regions 1, 2 and 4. As well as every episode from the season, the DVD release features bonus material such as deleted scenes, gag reels and behind-the-scenes featurettes.

References to other works
The episode titles reference many other popular works.

 Episode 11: "We're Not Not In Kansas Anymore" is a reference to both the pilot episode title "We're Not In Kansas Anymore" and Dorothy's same line from The Wizard of Oz.
 Episode 12: "Here Comes Honey Bye Bye" is a reference to the reality TV show Here Comes Honey Boo Boo,
 Episode 18: "A Portrait of the Artist As a Young Call Girl" is a reference to James Joyce's novel A Portrait of the Artist as a Young Man.
 Episode 19: "The Empire State Strikes Back" is a reference to Star Wars Episode V: The Empire Strikes Back.
 Episode 21: "Scandal Royale" is a reference to the James Bond film Casino Royale.

References

2012 American television seasons
2013 American television seasons